April is a feminine given name taken from the month of the same name. It was the most popular month name given to girls in the United States between 1960 and 2000. It was most well used in the Southern United States, where the spring season begins earlier than other regions of the country. The name is believed to have been particularly well-used because April is a month associated with renewal. The name has since declined in usage in English-speaking countries, but remains in regular use.

Those bearing it include:

People 
 April A. Benasich, American neuroscientist
 April Adams (born 1973), Australian diver
 April Ashley (1935–2021), English model, and transgender equality campaigner
 April Baker-Bell, American academic and non-fiction writer
 April D. Beldo (born 1964), American navy sailor
 April Berg (born 1974), American politician
 April Bernard (born 1956), American poet
 April Bey, American artist
 April Blair, American producer and screenwriter
 April Bloomfield (born 1974), British chef
 April Bowlby (born 1980), American actress
 April Boy Regino (1961–2020), Filipino musician
 April Brandley (born 1990), Australian professional netball player
 April Brockman - Del Monte (born 1986), Canadian reality television personality, author, and realtor
 April Brown, American electrical engineer and materials scientist
 April Bulmer (born 1963), Canadian poet
 April Byron (1947–2019), Australian pop singer and songwriter
 April Cantelo (born 1928), English soprano
 April Capone Almon (born c. 1975), American businesswoman and politician
 April Carrión (born 1989), Puerto Rican drag queen and television personality
 April Carson, American epidemiologist
 April Carter (born 1937), British peace activist
 April Charney, American consumer advocate and consumer attorney
 April Christofferson, American author and former attorney
 April Daniels, American television personality
 April Daniels (author), American author
 April Daye (born 1937), American former burlesque dancer, fine arts painter, recording artist, and jazz singer
 April De Angelis (born 1960), English dramatist of part Sicilian descent
 April DeConick, American religion academic and biblical scholar
 April Diamond (born 1986), American singer
 April Dunn (1986–2020), American disability rights activist
 April Evans, American soprano
 April Fabb (born 1955), English missing girl
 April Fairfield, American politician
 April Ferry (born 1932), American costume designer
 April FitzLyon (1920–1998), English translator, biographer, and historian
 April Flores, American pornographic actress, director, writer, photographer, makeup artist, and plus-size model
 April Fronzoni (born 1982), American field hockey striker
 April Gaede, American writer and activist for National Vanguard, a white nationalist organization
 April Genevieve Tucholke, American author
 April Glaspie (born 1942), American diplomat
 April Gornik (born 1953), American artist
 April Goss (born 1993), American football placekicker
 April Greiman (born 1948), American designer
 April H. Foley (born 1947), American diplomat
 April Hadi (born 1981), Indonesian footballer
 April Halprin Wayland (born 1954), American author, poet, and teacher
 April Haney (born 1969), American former actress, singer, and counselor
 April Heinrichs (born 1964), American soccer player and coach
 April Henry (born 1959), American author
 April Hickox (born 1955), Canadian artist, photographer, teacher, and curator
 April Holmes (born 1973), American Paralympic athlete
 April Hunter (born 1971), American professional wrestler, professional wrestling valet, boxer, actress, writer, fitness model, and glamour model
 April Ieremia (born 1967), New Zealand former netball player and television host
 April Ivy (born 1999), Portuguese singer-songwriter
 April Jace (1974–2014), American masters track and field athlete
 April Jeanette Mendez (born 1987), American professional wrestler who went by the ring name AJ Lee
 April Jones (2007–2012), Welsh murder victim
 April Kelly, American television writer and producer
 April Kihlstrom, American genre novelist
 April Lacy (1982–1996), American murder victim
 April Lawlor, Irish pop singer and songwriter
 April Lawton (1948–2006), American guitarist and composer
 April Lee, American artist
 April Lee Hernández (born 1980), American film and television actress
 April Macie (born 1976), American comedian, television personality, writer, and actress
 April Maiya, American film producer, director, and fashion designer
 April March (born 1965), American singer-songwriter and animator
 April March (dancer), American exotic dancer and burlesque performer
 April Margera (born 1956), American television personality known as the mother of Jackass/Viva La Bam star Bam Margera
 April Masini (born 1964), American stage- and television actress, advice columnist, and writer
 April Matson (born 1981), American actress and singer
 April McMahon (born 1964), British academic administrator and linguist
 April Meservy, American singer-songwriter, multi-instrumentalist, and record producer
 April Mullen, Canadian actress and director
 April Ngatupuna (born 2003), New Zealand rugby league and rugby union footballer
 April Olrich (1931–2014), Tanzania-born English ballerina and actress
 April O'Neil (born 1987), American adult film actress
 April Ossmann, American poet, teacher, and editor
 April Palmieri, American photographer and musician
 April Parker Jones, American television actress
 April Partridge (born ca. 1993), British chef
 April Pearson (born 1989), English actress
 April Phillips (born 1954), English actress, writer, singer, director, and film- and theatre producer
 April Phumo (1937–2011), South African footballer and coach
 April Rapier (born 1978), American photographer
 April Reign, American activist journalist
 April Richardson (born 1979), American stand-up comedian
 April Rose, several people
 April Ross (born 1982), American professional beach volleyball player
 April Ross Perez (born 1981), Filipino fashion model and beauty queen
 April Ryan (born 1967), American reporter, author, and correspondent
 April Samuels (born 1969), American rock drummer, songwriter, speaker, author, and philanthropist
 April Sanders, Canadian educator, physician, and politician
 April Sargent (born 1968), American ice dancer
 April Saul (born 1955), American journalist
 April Scott (born 1979), American actress and former model
 April Smith, several people
 April Steiner Bennett (born 1980), American pole vaulter
 April Stevens (born 1929), American singer
 April Stewart (born 1969), American voice actress
 April Stone, American basket weaver
 April Summers (born 1988), English glamour model
 April Sunami (born 1980), American artist
 April Sykes (born 1990), American professional basketball player
 April Telek (born 1975), Canadian actress
 April Tinsley (1980–1988), American murder victim
 April Ulring Larson (born 1950), American Lutheran bishop
 April Underwood, American businesswoman
 April Verch (born 1978), Canadian fiddler, singer, and step dancer
 April Wade (born 1986), American actress and producer
 April Walker (born 1943), English television actress
 April Waters, American painter
 April Weaver (born 1971), American politician and nurse
 April Webster, American casting director
 April Wilkerson (born 1987), American YouTuber
 April Winchell (born 1960), American actress, writer, and radio host
 April Wright, American writer, director, and producer

Fictional characters 
 April, a character from the 2015 anime adaptation Glitter Force
 April Branning, a character from the BBC soap opera EastEnders
 April Dancer, title character in the 1960s TV series The Girl from U.N.C.L.E.
 April Glover, a character in the animated children's series Little Bill
 April Green, a character from the television show Jericho
 April Kepner, a character from the ABC television medical drama Grey's Anatomy
 April Ludgate, a character in the NBC television comedy Parks and Recreation
 April MacLean, a character from the television show Class
 April O'Neil, a character from the Teenage Mutant Ninja Turtles comics and media franchise
April Patterson, a character in the comic strip For Better or For Worse
 April Rhodes, a character on Glee
 April Ryan, a character from the video game The Longest Journey and its sequel Dreamfall: The Longest Journey
 April Scott, a character from the Australian soap opera Home and Away
 April Stevens Ewing, a character from the 1980s soap opera Dallas
 April Young, a character on The Vampire Diaries

Notes

See also
 Abril
 April (surname)
 Avril (name)

Feminine given names
English feminine given names